Oxford Society may refer to:

 Oxford Society of Change Ringers, established in 1734, is a society dedicated to change ringing in Oxford, England
 Oxford Union Society
 The Oxford Society, previously associated with Oxford University

Organisations associated with the University of Oxford